Frontiers of Science was an illustrated comic strip created by Professor Stuart Butler of the School of Physics at the University of Sydney in collaboration with Robert Raymond, a documentary maker from the Australian Broadcasting Corporation (ABC) in 1961. The artist was Andrea Bresciani. After 1970 the comic was illustrated by David Emerson.

It explained scientific concepts and recent research and in a 3 or 4 panel illustrated strip in an accessible and easily comprehensible way. The strip was syndicated to over 200 newspapers around the world for 25 years, from 1961 to 1987. It was also published as soft cover books. As of 2011, it "retains the record of being the longest-running newspaper science comic strip in the world."

The strips are archived at Rare Books and Special Collections in Fisher Library at the University of Sydney. The entire series is available for viewing online.

References

External links
Drifting Through Inner Space Ocean deep exploration explained in 5 cartoon strips c late 1960s - at NASA website - Accessed July 2006.
University of Sydney Outreach projects, Frontiers of Science, - Accessed July 2006.
Frontiers of Science  Digital Collections, University of Sydney - Accessed April 2019.

Australian comic strips
1961 comics debuts
1987 comics endings
Science in society
Educational comics